Electricity delivery is the process that starts after generation of electricity in the power station, up to the use by the consumer.
The main processes in electricity delivery are, by order:
 Transmission
 Distribution
 Retailing

See also
Electrical grid
Electricity supply

References

Electric power